Margan (also Romanized as Mārgān; also known as Mārgūn, Mārgūn-e Bālā, and Mūrgāh) is a village in Komehr Rural District, in the Central District of Sepidan County, Fars Province, Iran. At the 2006 census, its population was 226, in 55 families.

References 

Populated places in Sepidan County